Foster's Group Pty. Ltd. was an Australian beer group with interests in brewing and soft drinks, known for Foster's Lager, now called Carlton & United Breweries since the company was renamed in 2011. Foster's was founded in 1888 in Melbourne, Victoria by two American brothers, who sold the brewery a year later.

The company was renamed prior to sale to British-South African multinational SABMiller in 2011.  Foster's wine business was split into a separate company, Treasury Wine Estates, in May 2011. In October 2016 Anheuser-Busch InBev acquired SABMiller, which ceased trading as a corporation, making the Foster's Group a direct subsidiary of the parent company. In June 2020, Carlton and United Breweries was sold to the Japanese beverage giant, Asahi Group Holdings.

History
Foster's was founded in Melbourne in 1888 by two American brothers William and Ralph Foster of New York, United States, who happened to own a refrigeration plant. Cooling was necessary to brew and store acceptable lagers in Australia's hot climate, unlike the English-style dark ales commonly brewed at the time. They sold the brewery the following year and returned to the United States.

In 1983 Elders IXL, a giant Australian diversified conglomerate, purchased Carlton and United Breweries, and renamed it Elders Brewing Group.  Then in 1990, the Elders Brewing Group changed its name to the Foster's Group, to reflect the name of their most internationally recognised product.

In 2005, Foster's Group acquired the Australian wine-making group Southcorp Wines. This acquisition added famous brands such as Penfolds, Lindemans and Rosemount to the Foster's stable and around A$1 billion to revenues.

In May 2011, Foster's Group's Treasury Wine Estates unit was spun off into a separate company. The first day of trading saw its share price soaring, valuing the separate entity at A$2.2 billion.

There had long been speculation that the beer sector or all of Foster's Group would be subject to a takeover by a larger firm. Groups to express such an interest over the years have included Diageo, the British-South African company SABMiller, Molson Coors and Heineken International. Foster's Group was renamed Carlton & United Breweries (CUB), and its wine business split into a separate company, Treasury Wine Estates, in May 2011. Foster's Group Limited shares (ASX code: FGL) were suspended from trading on the ASX on 2 December 2011 and delisted from the ASX at close of trading on 20 December 2011.

On 10 October 2016 Anheuser-Busch InBev acquired SABMiller. SABMiller was delisted and ceased trading on global stock markets, and Foster's Group became a direct subsidiary of Anheuser-Busch InBev SA/NV. As a result, Foster's Group became a direct subsidiary of Anheuser-Busch InBev SA/NV.

In 2019, Business Insider reported that Asahi Group Holdings, a large Japanese beverage corporation, would buy Anheuser-Busch InBev's Australian assets, "including Foster's beer and Carlton and United Breweries". In June 2020, Anheuser-Busch InBev completed the sale of Carlton and United Breweries to Asahi Group Holdings.

Business
In 1990, Asahi Breweries acquired a 19.9% stake in Australian brewery giant Elders IXL which later became Foster' s Group.

Foster's Group imports, licenses, and distributes a large number of brands. In Australia, Foster's distributes the Cinzano, Perrier, Skyy vodka, Stella Artois, and 42 Below import brands among many others. While in the United States and Canadian markets, Molson brews and sells Foster's Lager under license.

In August 2008, it was convicted and fined more than A$1 million for two breaches of Victoria's Occupational Health and Safety Act which led to the death of a worker in 2006. The prosecution of the company by the Director of Public Prosecutions for WorkSafe Victoria resulted in a call for the company to better report on health and safety in its annual report.

CEO Trevor O'Hoy resigned on 10 June 2008 after poor performance by the wine division of the group. O'Hoy was replaced by Ian Johnston on 21 July 2008 in the position of acting CEO.

Foster's announced yearly results which ended on 30 June 2009. The net sales revenue increases by 2.7% to A$4.5 billion. Net profit increases by 4.0% to A$741.5m and earnings per share increases by 4.6% to 38.5 cents.

In 2011, Fosters made major losses that including a write-down in the value of the wines division to A$1.8 billion that at the business's AGM in Melbourne on 29 April 2011, 99% of Fosters Group shareholders agreed to split Fosters Group business into two separate brewing and wines companies. The wines business became Treasury Wine Estates, and was listed on the ASX on 10 May 2011. In an ABC interview in late August 2011, the Carlton United Group (Fosters beer division) announced that they would be focusing more on craft beer to meet the change in taste of the Australian drinker.

In 2011, Foster's was acquired by SABMiller; the latter was acquired by Anheuser-Busch InBev SA/NV in October 2016.

Brands

Beers and breweries
Carlton & United Breweries
Carlton Black
Carlton Draught
Crown Lager
Melbourne Bitter
NT Draught
Pure Blonde
Reschs
Sheaf Stout
Victoria Bitter
Victoria Bitter Gold
Cascade Brewery
Cascade Amber Ale
Cascade Bitter
Cascade Blonde Lager
Cascade Draught
Cascade Export Stout
Cascade Green
Cascade Lager
Cascade Pale Ale
Cascade Premium Lager
Cascade Premium Light
Cascade Stout
Foster's
Foster's Lager
Foster's Lightice
Foster's Radler
 Great Northern Brewing Co.
 Grolsch
 KB
Matilda Bay Brewing Company
Alpha Pale Ale
Beez Neez
Big Helga
Bohemian Pilsner
Dog Bolter Dark Lager
Fat Yak
Redback
Miller
 Miller Chill
Miller Genuine Draft
Peroni
Peroni Nastro Azzurro
 Pilsner Urquell
 Power's Brewery
 Power's Bitter
 Power's dry
 Power's Gold

Cider
 Bulmers
 Mercury
 Strongbow

Spirits
 Akropolis Oyzo
 Barossa Brandy
 Black Jack
 Continental Liqueurs
 Cougar Bourbon
 Coyote Tequila
 Karloff
 Kirov
 Prince Albert's Gin
 The Black Douglas

Non-alcohol
Cascade
Torquay

See also 
 List of breweries in Australia

References

External links
 Beringer, Foster's Pop Champagne On Deal
 Interview with CEO of Foster's Group
 Foster's History

 
Multinational companies headquartered in Australia
Food and drink companies established in 1888
1888 establishments in Australia
SABMiller
Companies formerly listed on the Australian Securities Exchange
Holding companies of Australia
AB InBev brands

it:Foster's